Soham Swami (also known as "Tiger Swami," Sohong Swami, Parmahangsa Soham Swami or Sohom Swami, Bengali: শ্রীমৎ পরমহংস সোহংস্বামী ) was a Hindu guru and yogi from India. Originally named as Shyama Kanta Bandopadhyay, he was the disciple of the Advaita Vedantist Tibbetibaba. Tibbetibaba was a great yogi and guru of India.

Soham Swami was born as Shyama Kanta Bandopadhyay at Adial, a small village in Bikrampur district in the Bengali month of Jaishthya in 1858 and was one of the pioneers of physical prowess of modern Bengal. He had so much physical strength that he could wrestle even tigers. He was known to the public, both Indian and European, as Professor Banerjee, the first tiger tamer of India, and to his admirers in Bengal as BaghaShyamakanta.  These tiger bouts took place before he entered into the spiritual path.

Soham Swami built a hermitage near a crematorium in Bhawali in Nainital. It was at the Nainital ashram, Niralamba Swami became his disciple. In his early life Niralamba Swami, also known as Jatindra Nath Banerjee, was a great freedom fighter of India.

Early life (1858–1881)

‌

Shyama Kanta's family belonged to the Bandyoghati branch of Rarhi Kulin Brahmans of Phulia Mel  and Sandalya Gotra (family of Bhatta Narayana). Born in the Bengali month of Jaistha (16 May to 15 June) in the year 1858, he was the eldest son of Shashi Bhusan Bandopadhyay of Ariyal village in the district of Dacca. Shashi Bhusan was the keeper of records of the court of Tripura in Muradnagar in the district of Comilla. Shyama Kanta was the eldest of the seven siblings. His three brothers were Nishi Kanta, Surja Kanta, and Shitala Kanta. The eldest of his three sisters Sarala was widowed in childhood. She later became a monk and was renamed Sayambhati. His other two sisters were Sushila and Suniti.

After completing his elementary education from a primary school in Muradnagar, Shyama Kanta joined Dacca Collegiate School. Here, the young Shyama Kanta, with like-minded friends like Paresh Nath Ghosh, Basanta Deb Choudhury, Jagat Kishore Acharya, Barada Kanta, and others, joined the wrestling gymnasium of Dacca’s famous wrestler Adhar Ghosh. Here the traditional bodybuilding and wrestling exercises made these young men strong and fearless.

The martial feats of the famous Italian revolutionary Giuseppe Garibaldi had kindled the hope of liberating the subject nation through military revolution. Unfortunately, educated Bengalis were barred from joining the British Indian army, and learning the intricacies of warfare from the fragmented armies of the native rulers was of no consequence. After touring central and western India with his friend Paresh Nath Ghosh, Shyama Kanta abandoned his military ambition and returned home in Dacca.

In 1879, 21-year old Shyama Kanta married 12-year old Kadambini, the daughter of Kali Charan Chattopadhyay a resident of Dvipara, a village in Dacca district. At the same time, Shyama Kanta joined the retinue of Maharaja Bir Chandra Manikya Bahadur, the ruler of Tripura as his bodyguard. He resigned from the Maharaja’s service after two years, though both of them maintained a lifelong cordial relationship. In 1881 he joined Barishal District School as a physical education teacher.

Wrestling with tigers (1882–1899) 
All along Shyama Kanta nurtured an ambition of doing something extraordinary to awaken the downtrodden countrymen and motivate them to fight the imperial master and win freedom. The major impediment to liberation was fear. Only when Indians could overcome the fear of the mighty Imperialist force could it be possible for them to challenge the British. An opportunity came when the news of a leopard captured in Sunamganj in the district of Sylhet reached the young wrestler. Shyama Kanta purchased the leopard and gradually mastered the art of wrestling with the wild cat. He performed his first act in Sunamganj. His extraordinary feat made him famous in a short time and the rich and powerful Zamindars famous for their hunting adventures often challenged Shyama Kanta to prove his mettle by wrestling with freshly trapped wild tigers. When Shyama Kanta emerged victoriously he demanded the wild animals and the Royal Bengal tigers joined his circus. In 1886, he officially formed his circus company and toured across Bengal, Bihar, and Tripura. He was also known for smashing heavy stones on his chest. It is believed that during this same time, Shyama Kanta was engaged in a secret mission of training young men in wrestling and bodybuilding and preparing them for revolutionary activities. For 17 years Shyama Kanta entertained audience across Bengal and Bihar with his tiger wrestling acts.

Monasticism (1900–1918) 
The transcendental journey of Shyama Kanta had begun in his teenage days ever since he encountered the unnamed ascetic in Muradnagar. Burdened by familial duties, Shyama Kanta had kept his real goal under covers until 1898. On witnessing the destruction of an earthquake and death Shyama Kanta felt the desperation to re-embark his transcendental journey.

He pondered,I am not on the bank of the river-like flowing time. My life, alas, forced by the current of time is flowing downstream relentlessly. Childhood, adolescence, bachelorhood, youth have passed away. Flowing down the current of time, I’ve now approached middle-age Indulged in the enjoyment of worldly pleasure I was almost ignorant. I failed to notice that with the current of time, life is fading. The morning of life - childhood and adolescence have passed away in fun and frolic. In the noon of life, in my youth I was engaged in serving my passions. Gradually arrived the evening, life’s daytime is nearing its end. Now life’s sun is preparing slowly to set in the west. I’ve been entrapped in the snare of illusion like a greedy deer. Who knows when the hunter-time will kill me? (Sannyasi, Soham Gita)Time is passing away, but he has not yet known the Truth. He has lost all his desires for fame and wealth. No longer interested in family and friends, and having severed all emotional attachments he is now a desperate seeker of the knowledge of reality. On 29 September 1900, Shashi Bhushan passed away. After completing his father’s funeral rites, Shyama Kanta left his home never to return. While touring the Himalayas, he met a monk who advised him to go to Varanasi where he will find the great Advaitin philosopher Tibbatibaba who will guide him in his spiritual journey. In August 1901 he officially renounced the material world and became an ascetic. His master renamed him Soham Swami.

Soham Swami set up his hermitage at Bhawali near Nainital in modern-day Uttarakhand, India. He followed the spiritual path of Advaita or non-dualism and was a staunch critic of religious bigotry and superstitions. On 6 December 1918, Soham Swami passed away while in deep meditation or Samadhi in his hermitage at Bhawali. His samadhi(tomb) is located at Palitpur, Burdwan, India.There is also a symbolic samadhi at his Nainital ashram. It is due to the fact that after his mahasamadhi or death at his Nainital ashram, his last remains were brought to the Palitpur ashram of Tibbetibaba and a samadhi (tomb) was built at the Palitpur ashram.

Author 
In the last 10 years of his life, from 1908 until his death in 1918, Soham Swami wrote copiously on Vedanta. The first written work of Soham Swami, Soham Geeta, a Bengali philosophical poem dealing with Advaitavad, was published in 1909. In 1910, was published Soham Tattva, a collection of articles. Following the ‘pressure laid upon him by many of his European admirers and acquaintances', Soham Swami versified his philosophical thoughts in English, and Truth was published in 1913. Soham Sanhita in Bengali was published in 1914. Between 1915 and 1917, he wrote three books, Bibek Gatha and Shambuk Badh Kabya in Bengali, and Common Sense in English. On 6 November 1918, a month before the last day of his life, he completed his last work, Bhagabat Geetar Shamolochana (Critical Review of the Bhagavad Gita), which was published posthumously on his first death anniversary on 6 December 1919. The foundation of his writings was his experience of enlightenment, his exploration of the Hindu society and the scriptural texts and philosophical writings of eastern and western scholars. The first eight years of his monastic life, prior to his literary pursuits, were spent in intensively studying the scriptures and books of Indian and western philosophy. According to Surja Kanta Banerjee (his third brother and the original publisher of his books), before writing Soham Geeta, Soham Swami consulted 142 Aryan theological treatises including the Vedas, Vedanta and philosophies, books penned by Sufi mystics such as Mansur Al-Hallaj, Mawlana Rumi and Shams-i-Tabrizi, writings of Sadhakas such as Kabir, Nanak, Tulsidas and others and books written by western scholars including Ralph Waldo Emerson, Johann Wolfgang von Goethe and Herbert Spencer.

Written works
The writings of Soham Swami include books named:

Soham Gita: This book contains teachings of Soham Swami.It is a poem on Advaita philosophy.
Soham Tattva: This book is a collection of Bengali prose on Vedanta.
Soham Samhita: This book contains teachings of Soham Swami.
Common Sense: This book attempts to prove that all religions of the world are full of absurdities, inconsistencies, and fallacies. In this book the importance of development of common sense and realization of divinity in all beings is stressed. This book was first published in 1923.
Truth: This book was the only book written by him in English poetry. It was published in Calcutta, now Kolkata, in 1913. 
His other notable works included: Bibekgatha, Shambuk Badh Kavya, Bhagabat Geetar Shamolochana.

Philosophy and teachings

One soul 
As a follower of Advaitavad (non-dualism), Soham Swami promoted the doctrine of Ekatma Vijnana or the knowledge of the indivisible one soul. With the logical reasoning of a philosopher as well as his own experience of super-consciousness in Samadhi, he supported this doctrine of One Soul.

Non-existence of personal God 
“The God whom East and West alike acclaim,

I found imposture and an empty name.” (Truth)Soham Swami rejected the existence of a Personal God, which, according to him is an incorrect concept influenced by the Abrahamic religions. "God", he found through logical analysis, is a creation of man. He wrote, "Men create their Gods from inference just like their counterparts.  Hence, the idea of God varies in accordance with different cultures.

Apart from logical reasoning, Swamiji’s own experience of Samadhi and Virat clarified the non-existence of God. He writes in Soham Tattva: If there was a Creator-God independent of the world then in the state of Yoga, that is while passing from the state of the sentient being to the state of Samadhi and again when reversing to the state of the sentient being from Samadhi  he would have been found in the world or behind it. After severing the bondage of the awareness of the existence of the body when one beholds with a liberated vision, at that time it is seen that I (Soul) exist as the world; there is no other object or person. Again when this mirage of the world created from my imagination disappears at that time behind the world only the unqualified pure conscious existence of the Soul is manifested; there is no other existence. Where is God? Where is the Creator? Everything is only a false imagination. Only I (Soul) am true.

Notes

References

Ghosh, Sudhanshu Ranjan, "Bharater Sadhak O Sadhika"(Bengali edition), India: Tuli Kalam Publication, 1, College Row, Kolkata – 700 009 (1992.Bengali calendar year – 1399), pp. 318–343
Chakravorty, Subodh, "Bharater Sadhak – Sadhika"(Bengali edition), India: Kamini Publication, 115, Akhil Mistry Lane, Kolkata – 700 009 (1997.Bengali calendar year – 1404), Volume 1, pp. 450–478 and 500–522
Murphet, Howard, Sai Baba: Man of Miracles, Weiser Boo Publication, (1977). , p. 152.
Sanyal, Jagadiswar, Guide To Indian Philosophy (1996 ed.), India: Sribhumi Publishing Company (1999), 79, Mahatma Gandhi Road, Kolkata – 700 009.
Hornby, A S, "Oxford Advanced Learner's Dictionary of Current English" (5th ed.), UK: Oxford University Press (1998). , pp. 1433–1475.
Why I am an Atheist: Bhagat Singh, People's Publishing House, New Delhi, India.
Swami, Soham, "Common Sense", Bangladesh: Surja Kanta Banerjee, Gandharia Press, Dacca(Dhaka)  (1923). pp. 1–3.
Misra, Kunjeshwar, Tibbatibabar Parichay(Bengali edition), India: Tibbati Baba Vedanta Ashram, 76/3, Taantipara Lane, P.O. Santragachi, Howrah – 711 104, West Bengal (1934. Bengali calendar year – 1341), pp. 1–60
Brahmachari, Akhandananda, Paramhamsa Tibbati Babar Smriti Katha(Bengali edition), India: Tibbati Baba Vedanta Ashram, 76/3, Taantipara Lane, P.O. Santragachi, Howrah – 711 104, West Bengal (May 2003), pp. 1–50
Sharma, I. Mallikarjuna, "In retrospect: Sagas of heroism and sacrifice of Indian revolutionaries", Ravi Sasi Enterprises, India (edition: 1999). p. 94.
Roy Dilip Kumar, Devi Indira, "Pilgrims of the stars: autobiography of two yogis", India (edition: 1985). p. 357.
Keshavmurti, "Sri Aurobindo, the hope of man", Dipti Publications, India. (edition 1969). p. 258.
Heehs, Peter, "The bomb in Bengal: the rise of revolutionary terrorism in India, 1900–1910", Oxford University Press. (edition 1993). p. 62.
"A bibliography of Indian English", Central Institute of English and Foreign Languages, India. (edition 1972). p. 97.
Luzac & Co. (London, England), "Luzac's oriental list and book review", Luzac and Co. (edition 1924). p. 33.
Mukherjee, Arpita, "THE MONK WHO TAMED THE TIGER: Biography of Paramhangsa Soham Swami", Sayambhati Publication, India. (edition 2018)
Mukherjee, Jayasree, "The Ramakrishna-Vivekananda movement impact on Indian society and politics (1893–1922): with special reference to Bengal", Firma KLM. (edition 1997). .  p. 255.

1920 deaths
19th-century Hindu religious leaders
20th-century Hindu religious leaders
Advaitin philosophers
Bengali Hindus
Indian Hindu spiritual teachers
Indian Hindu monks
Indian yogis
Tibbetibaba
Year of birth missing